Sherlock Holmes and the Valley of Fear is a 1983 Australian animated television film produced by Tom Stacey and George Stephenson for Burbank Films. It is an adaptation of Sir Arthur Conan Doyle's novel The Valley of Fear (1915), the fourth and final Sherlock Holmes novel featuring Sherlock Holmes and Dr. John Watson.

Voice cast
 Peter O'Toole as Sherlock Holmes
 Earle Cross as Dr. Watson
 Additional voices are provided by Brian Adams, Colin Borgonon. Judy Nunn.

References

External links

1983 television films
1983 films
Australian children's animated films
Australian television films
Sherlock Holmes films
Animated films based on British novels
1980s Australian animated films
1980s Australian films